Aneekkara Poomala Bhagavathi Temple is a Hindu temple in the village of Kunhimangalam. This is situated in Thekkumbad, the southern side of Kunhimangalam. Aneekkara poomaala bhagavathi is the idol of this temple. Some ceremony of this temple is related to Malliyottu palottu kaavu.

Poojas
 Chovva vilakku
 Thulaabharam
 Naalam paattu
 Chuttu vilakku
 Neyy vilakku

History
It is said that Poomala bhagavathi had come here via a ship. She liked the place and she wanted stay there. So with her powers, she pushed the sea outwards to reveal the land underneath and a temple was constructed there. So the place came to be known as "Ayiniki Kara" (Malayalam- ആയിനിക്കി കര) or Anikara (അനികര). Some say that bones of fish had been found in the sand.

Festivals
 Paattulsavam
 Kaliyaattam
 Poorolsavam

References

Hindu temples in Kannur district
Bhagavathi temples in Kerala